The Whites Falls, a waterfall on Behana Creek, is located in the UNESCO World Heritagelisted Wet Tropics in the Far North region of Queensland, Australia.

The falls are situated above Clamshell Falls in the Wooroonooran National Park.

See also

 List of waterfalls of Queensland

References

Waterfalls of Far North Queensland